SK Super Nova is a Latvian association football club currently playing in the Virslīga. They were founded in 2000 in the city of Olaine.

About 
The club was founded in 2000. In 2018, they were promoted to the country's second division . In the first two seasons they made it to the promotion rounds to Virslīga, where the team was defeated in both cases. In 2022, they were promoted to the Virslīga.

Squad

References

External links 
  
 online.lff.lv
 Latvijas Futbola federācija

Football clubs in Latvia
2000 establishments in Latvia